John Brand Sr. House is a historic home located at Elmira in Chemung County, New York.  It was built about 1870 and is a large -story, Italianate-style dwelling with a 2-story wing.  Also on the property is a concrete fountain basin with a reproduction Victorian fountainhead.

It was listed on the National Register of Historic Places in 2010. It is located in the Maple Avenue Historic District.

References

Italianate architecture in New York (state)
Houses completed in 1870
Houses on the National Register of Historic Places in New York (state)
Houses in Chemung County, New York
Buildings and structures in Elmira, New York
National Register of Historic Places in Chemung County, New York
Historic district contributing properties in New York (state)